The National Maritime Complex (NMC) is a proposed facility to be built in Chennai, India.

Constituents
 National Maritime Museum & Maritime Art Gallery
 Marine Aquarium
 Maritime Commercial Complex
 Maritime Sector Offices
 Marine Food Court and Catering College
 Maritime Convention Centre with a Five Star Hotel
 Golf Course and Water Sports

References

Buildings and structures in Chennai
Water transport in India
Proposed buildings and structures in India
Maritime organizations